Matthews is a 2017 documentary film directed by Ryan Scott Warren, produced by Joe Pierce, and written by J. David Everhart. It is about the life and legacy of British footballer Sir Stanley Matthews.

Synopsis 
Matthews tells the true story of the life and career of Sir Stanley Matthews considered by many to be the greatest footballer of all time. It documents his early years to his football career playing for Stoke City, Blackpool, and England, playing in the 1950 FIFA World Cup and 1954 FIFA World Cup, to his retired years as a coach for an all-black team in Soweto known as "Stan's Men". The film includes interviews from Sir Richard Branson, Sir Michael Parkinson, Gary Lineker, and Stanley Matthews's son Stanley Jr.

Release  
The premiere of Matthews was held at the Stoke Film Theatre in Stoke-on-Trent on 18 October 2017 and it was released digitally on 23 October 2017.

Reception 
Colin Lomas of Vulture Hound calls Matthews "an excellent portrait of a very humble man" and UK magazine Radio Times has given the film a 3/5 star review.

References

External links 
 
 

2017 films
2017 documentary films
American documentary films
2010s English-language films
2010s American films